Chris Corbeil (born May 22, 1988 in Mississauga, Ontario) is a lacrosse player for the Saskatchewan Rush in the National Lacrosse League.  Corbeil was drafted in the second round (15th overall) in the 2009 NLL Entry Draft by the Buffalo Bandits.

Heading into the 2023 NLL season, Inside Lacrosse ranked Corbeil the #9 best defender in the NLL.

He represented Canada at the 2015 and 2019 World Box Lacrosse Championships, winning gold on both occasions.  He was captain of Team Canada for the 2019 tournament.

Statistics

NLL

References

External links 
 NLL page

1988 births
Living people
Buffalo Bandits players
Canadian lacrosse players
Edmonton Rush players
Saskatchewan Rush players
Lacrosse people from Ontario
Sportspeople from Mississauga